Caselette is a town and comune in the Metropolitan City of Turin, in the Piedmont region of northern Italy.

It is located at the entrance of the Val di Susa,  from Turin, at the foot of Monte Musinè. It is home to the Castle of the Cays Count, which is currently owned by the Salesians. Rock carvings of uncertain origin and the remains of a Roman villa have been found in the vicinity, on Mount Musinè.
Close to Caselette stands the Pietra Alta, one of the biggest and more popular glacial erratics of Piedmont.

Twin towns
 Ricse, Hungary, since 2004

References

Cities and towns in Piedmont